Latík refers to two different coconut-based ingredients in Filipino cuisine. In the Visayan region it refers to a syrupy caramelized coconut cream (coconut caramel) used as a dessert sauce. In the northern Philippines, it refers to solid byproducts of coconut oil production (coconut curds), used as garnishing for a variety of desserts.

Visayan Latik
Latík in its original sense in the Visayan languages literally means 'syrup' (equivalent to arnibal in Hiligaynon). It can refer to any type of thick sweetened liquids including jam. In the most common usage, however, latik means a syrupy condiment derived from reducing coconut milk and sugar.

It is used much in the same way as syrup, in dishes like kalamay and suman. It is usually Anglicized as "coconut caramel." A commercial version of the Visayan latik is marketed internationally as coconut syrup, though it should not be confused with coconut sugar derived from coconut sap.

Tagalog Latík
Latík in Luzon is made from coconut milk simmered in a saucepan until it reduces to coconut oil and solids ("coconut curds") begin to form at the top surface. These solids are left to fry in the coconut oil until golden brown. In the Visayas, these solids are known as lunok in Cebuano; and balutai in Karay-a.

Latík is commonly used as topping for a variety of Philippine dishes including maja blanca, sapin-sapin, and ube halaya.

They are sometimes mistaken for fried caramelized coconut flesh (another type of garnishing/dessert known as bukayo in Bisaya).

See also
 Kalamay
 Coconut jam
 List of condiments
 List of dessert sauces
 List of Philippine dishes
 Maglalatik (literally "latik maker"), an indigenous Philippine dance
 Philippine condiments

References

Foods containing coconut
Dessert sauces
Philippine condiments
Philippine desserts